The Boeing Vertol CH-46 Sea Knight is a medium-lift tandem-rotor transport helicopter powered by twin turboshaft engines. It was designed by Vertol and manufactured by Boeing Vertol following Vertol's acquisition by Boeing.

Development of the Sea Knight, which was originally designated by the firm as the Vertol Model 107, commenced during 1956. It was envisioned as a successor to the first generation of rotorcraft, such as the H-21 "Flying Banana", that had been powered by piston engines; in its place, the V-107 made use of the emergent turboshaft engine. On 22 April 1958, the V-107 prototype performed its maiden flight. During June 1958, the US Army awarded a contract for the construction of ten production-standard aircraft, designated as the YHC-1A, based on the V-107; this initial order was later cut down to three YHC-1As though. During 1961, the US Marine Corps (USMC), which had been studying its requirements for a medium-lift, twin-turbine cargo/troop assault helicopter, selected Boeing Vertol's Model 107M as the basis from which to manufacture a suitable rotorcraft to meet their needs. Known colloquially as the "Phrog" and formally as the "Sea Knight", it was operated across all US Marine Corps' operational environments between its introduction during the Vietnam War and its frontline retirement during 2014.
 
The Sea Knight was operated by the USMC to provide all-weather, day-or-night assault transport of combat troops, supplies and equipment until it was replaced by the MV-22 Osprey during the 2010s. The USMC also used the helicopter for combat support, search and rescue (SAR), casualty evacuation and Tactical Recovery of Aircraft and Personnel (TRAP). The Sea Knight also functioned as the US Navy's standard medium-lift utility helicopter prior to the type being phased out of service in favor of the MH-60S Knighthawk during the early 2000s. Several overseas operators acquired the rotorcraft as well. Canada operated the Sea Knight, designated as CH-113; the type was used predominantly in the SAR role until 2004. Other export customers for the type included Japan, Sweden, and Saudi Arabia. The commercial version of the rotorcraft is the BV 107-II, commonly referred to simply as the "Vertol".

Development

Origins
During the 1940s and 1950s, American rotorcraft manufacturer Piasecki Helicopter emerged as a pioneering developer of tandem-rotor helicopters; perhaps the most famous of these being the piston-powered H-21 "Flying Banana", an early utility and transport helicopter. During 1955, Piasecki was officially renamed as Vertol Corporation (standing for vertical take-off and landing); it was around this time that work commenced on the development of a new generation of tandem rotor helicopter. During 1956, the new design received the internal company designation of Vertol Model 107, or simply V-107; this rotorcraft differed from its predecessors by harnessing the newly developed turboshaft engine instead of piston-based counterparts. During that year, construction of a prototype, powered by a pair of Lycoming T53 turboshaft engines, each one being capable of producing 877 shp (640 kW), commenced.

On 22 April 1958, the V-107 prototype performed its maiden flight. In order to garner publicity for the newly developed rotorcraft, it was decided to use the prototype to conduct a series of publicised flight demonstrations during a tour across the United States and several overseas nations. During June 1958, it was announced that the U.S. Army had awarded a contract to Vertol for the construction of ten production-standard aircraft based on the V-107, which were designated YHC-1A. However, this order was later decreased to three helicopters; according to aviation author Jay P. Spenser, the cutback had been enacted in order that the U.S. Army would be able to divert funds for the development of the rival V-114 helicopter, which was also a turbine-powered tandem rotor design but substantially larger than the V-107. All of the U.S. Army's three YHC-1As were powered by pairs of GE-T-58 engines. During August 1959, the first YHC-1A-model rotorcraft conducted its first flight; independently, it was shortly followed by the maiden flight of an improved model intended for the commercial and export markets, designated 107-II.

During 1960, the U.S. Marine Corps evolved a requirement for a medium-lift, twin-turbine troop/cargo assault helicopter to replace the various piston-engined types that were then in widespread use with the service. That same year, American aviation company Boeing acquired Vertol, after which the group was consequently renamed Boeing Vertol. Following a competition between several competing designs, during early 1961, it was announced that Boeing Vertol had been selected to manufacture its model 107M for the U.S. Marine Corps, where it was designated HRB-1. During 1962, the U.S. Air Force placed its own order for 12 XCH-46B Sea Knight helicopters, which used the XH-49A designation; however, the service later decided to cancel the order due to delays in its delivery; instead, the U.S. Air Force opted to procure the rival Sikorsky S-61R in its place.

Following the Sea Knight's first flight in August 1962, the military designation was changed to CH-46A. During November 1964, the introduction of the Marines' CH-46A and the Navy's UH-46As commenced. The UH-46A variant was a modified version of the rotorcraft to perform the vertical replenishment mission. The CH-46A was equipped with a pair of T58-GE8-8B turboshaft engines, each being rated at 1,250 shp (930 kW); these allowed the Sea Knight to carry up to 17 passengers or a maximum of 4,000 pounds (1,815 kg) of cargo.

Further developments

During 1966, production of the improved CH-46D commenced with deliveries following shortly thereafter. This model featured various improvements, including modified rotor blades and the adoption of more powerful T58-GE-10 turboshaft engines, rated at  each. During late 1967, the improved model was introduced to the Vietnam theater, where it supplemented the U.S. Marine Corps' existing CH-46A fleet, which had proven to be relatively unreliable and problematic in service. Along with the USMC's CH-46Ds, the U.S. Navy also acquired a small number of UH-46Ds for ship resupply purposes. In addition, approximately 33 CH-46As were progressively re-manufactured to the CH-46D standard.

Between 1968 and 1971, the U.S. Marine Corps received a number of CH-46F standard rotorcraft. This model retained the T58-GE-10 engines used on the CH-46D while featuring revised avionics and featured a number of other modifications. The CH-46F was the final production model of the type. During its service life, the Sea Knight received a variety of upgrades and modifications. Over time, the majority of the U.S. Marine Corps' Sea Knights were upgraded to the improved CH-46E standard. This model featured fiberglass rotor blades, reinforcement measures throughout the airframe, along with the refitting of further uprated T58-GE-16 engines, capable of producing  each; in addition, several CH-46Es were modified to double their maximum fuel capacity. Starting in the mid-1990s, the Dynamic Component Upgrade (DCU) programmes was enacted, focusing on the implementation of strengthened drive systems and modified rotor controls.

The commercial variant, the BV 107-II, was first ordered by New York Airways during 1960. During July 1962, they took delivery of their first three aircraft, which was configured to seat up to 25 passengers. During 1965, Boeing Vertol sold the manufacturing rights of the 107 to Japanese conglomerate Kawasaki Heavy Industries. Under this arrangement, all Model 107 civilian and military aircraft built in Japan were referred to by the KV 107 designation. On 15 December 2006, Columbia Helicopters, Inc acquired the type certificate for the BV 107-II; at the time, the company was reportedly in the process of acquiring a Production Certificate from the Federal Aviation Administration (FAA). Plans for actual production of the aircraft were not announced.

Design
The Boeing Vertol CH-46 Sea Knight is a medium-lift tandem-rotor transport helicopter, furnished with a set of counter-rotating main rotors in a tandem-rotor configuration. It was typically powered by a pair of General Electric T58 turboshaft engines, which were mounted on each side of the rear rotor pedestal; power to the forward rotor was transferred from the rear-mounted engines via a drive shaft. For redundancy, both engines are coupled so that either one would be capable of powering both of the main rotors in the event of a single engine failure or a similar emergency situation. Each of the rotors feature three blades, which can be folded to better facilitate storage and naval operations. The CH-46 features a fixed tricycle landing gear, complete with twin wheels on all three legs of the landing gear; this configuration results in a nose-up stance, helping to facilitate cargo loading and unloading. Two of the main landing gear were installed within protruding rear sponsons; the free interior space of the sponsons are also used to house fuel tanks, possessing a total capacity of 350 US gallons (1,438 L).

The interior of the CH-46 was largely taken up by its cargo bay, complete with a rear loading ramp that could be removed or left open in flight for the carriage of extended cargoes or for parachute drops. When operated in a typical configuration, the CH-46 would usually be operated by a crew of three; a larger crew could be accommodated when required, which would be dependent upon mission specifics. For example, a search and rescue (SAR) variant would usually carry a crew of five (Pilot, Co-Pilot, Crew Chief, Swimmer, and Medic) to facilitate all aspects of such operations. For self-defense, a pintle-mounted 0.50 in (12.7 mm) Browning machine gun could be mounted on each side of the helicopter. Service in southeast Asia resulted in the addition of armor along with the machine guns.

Operational history

United States
Known colloquially as the "Phrog", the Sea Knight was used in all U.S. Marine operational environments between its introduction during the Vietnam War and its frontline retirement in 2014. The type's longevity and reputation for reliability led to mantras such as "phrogs phorever" and "never trust a helicopter under 30". CH-46s transported personnel, evacuated wounded, supplied forward arming and refueling points (FARP), performed vertical replenishment, search and rescue, recovered downed aircraft and crews and other tasks.

Vietnam War

During the Vietnam War, the CH-46 was one of the prime US Marine troop transport helicopters in the theater, slotting between the smaller Bell UH-1 Iroquois and larger Sikorsky CH-53 Sea Stallion. CH-46 operations were plagued by major technical problems; the engines, being prone to foreign object damage (FOD) from debris being ingested when hovering close to the ground and subsequently suffering a compressor stall, had a lifespan as low as 85 flight hours; on 21 July 1966, all CH-46s were grounded until more efficient filters had been fitted.

On 3 May 1967, a CH-46D at Marine Corps Air Facility Santa Ana crashed, killing all four members of the crew. Within three days the accident investigators had determined that the mounting brackets of the main transmission had failed, allowing the front and rear overlapping rotors to intermesh. All CH-46s were temporarily grounded for inspection. On 13 May, a CH-46A crashed off the coast of Vietnam when the tail pylon containing the engines, main transmission and aft rotors broke off in flight. All four crew members were killed. On 20 June, another CH-46A crashed, though two of the four-man crew survived. Once again, even though the aircraft was not recovered from the water, failure of some sort in the rear pylon was suspected. On 30 June a CH-46D at Santa Ana crashed when a rotor blade separated from the aircraft, all three of the crew survived. As a result of this latest accident, all CH-46Ds were immediately grounded, but the CH-46As continued flying. On 3 July another CH-46A crashed in Vietnam, killing all four Marines of its crew. The cause of the crash again was traced to failure of the main transmission.

On 31 August 1967, a CH-46A on a medical evacuation mission to  disintegrated in midair killing all its occupants. The following day another CH-46A experienced a similar incident at Marble Mountain Air Facility leading to the type being grounded for all except emergency situations and cutting Marine airlift capacity in half. An investigation conducted by a joint Naval Air Systems Command/Boeing Vertol accident investigation team revealed that structural failures were occurring in the area of the rear pylon resulting in the rear rotor tearing off in flight and may have been the cause of several earlier losses. The team recommended structural and systems modifications to reinforce the rear rotor mount as well as installation of an indicator to detect excessive strain on critical parts of the aircraft. 80 CH-46As were shipped to Marine Corps Air Station Futenma, Okinawa where they received the necessary modifications by a combined force of Marine and Boeing Vertol personnel. The modified CH-46As began returning to service in December 1967 and all had been returned to service by February 1968.

During the 1972 Easter Offensive, Sea Knights saw heavy use to convey US and South Vietnamese ground forces to and around the front lines. By the end of US military operations in Vietnam, over a hundred Sea Knights had been lost to enemy fire.

Post-Vietnam
  

In February 1968 the Marine Corps Development and Education Command obtained several CH-46s to perform herbicide dissemination tests using HIDAL (Helicopter, Insecticide Dispersal Apparatus, Liquid) systems; testing indicated the need for redesign and further study. Tandem-rotor helicopters were often used to transport nuclear warheads; the CH-46A was evaluated to deploy Naval Special Forces with the Special Atomic Demolition Munition (SADM). Nuclear Weapon Accident Exercise 1983 (NUWAX-83), simulating the crash of a Navy CH-46E carrying 3 nuclear warheads, was conducted at the Nevada Test Site on behalf of several federal agencies; the exercise, which used real radiological agents, was depicted in a Defense Nuclear Agency-produced documentary.

U.S. Marine CH-46s were used to deploy the 8th Marine Regiment into Grenada during Operation Urgent Fury, evacuated the surviving crewmember of a downed AH-1 Cobra, and then carried infantry from the 75th Ranger Regiment to secure and evacuate U.S. students at the Grand Anse campus of St. George's University, though one crashed after colliding with a palm tree.

CH-46E Sea Knights were also used by the U.S. Marine Corps during the 2003 invasion of Iraq. In one incident on 1 April 2003, Marine CH-46Es and CH-53Es carried U.S. Army Rangers and Special Operations troops on an extraction mission for captured Army Private Jessica Lynch from an Iraqi hospital. During the subsequent occupation of Iraq and counter-insurgency operations, the CH-46E was heavily used in the CASEVAC role, being required to maintain 24/7 availability regardless of conditions. According to authors Williamson Murray and Robert H Scales, the Sea Knight displayed serious reliability and maintenance problems during its deployment to Iraq, as well as "limited lift capabilities". Following the loss of numerous US helicopters in the Iraqi theatre, the Marines opted to equip their CH-46s with more advanced anti-missile countermeasures.

The U.S. Navy retired the type on 24 September 2004, replacing it with the MH-60S Seahawk; the Marine Corps maintained its fleet as the MV-22 Osprey was fielded. In March 2006 Marine Medium Helicopter Squadron 263 (HMM-263) was deactivated and redesignated VMM-263 to serve as the first MV-22 squadron. The replacement process continued through the other medium helicopter squadrons into 2014. On 5 October 2014, the Sea Knight performed its final service flight with the U.S. Marine Corps at Marine Corps Air Station Miramar. HMM-364 was the last squadron to use it outside the United States, landing it aboard  on her maiden transit. On 9 April 2015, the CH-46 was retired by the Marine Medium Helicopter Training Squadron 164, the last Marine Corps squadron to transition to the MV-22. The USMC retired the CH-46 on 1 August 2015 in a ceremony at the Udvar-Hazy Center near Washington DC.

Beginning in April 2011 the Navy's Fleet Readiness Center East began refurbishing retired USMC CH-46Es for service with the United States Department of State Air Wing. A number of CH-46s from HMX-1 were transferred to the Air Wing in late 2014. In Afghanistan the CH-46s were used by Embassy Air for secure transport of State Department personnel. The CH-46s were equipped with missile warning sensors and flare dispensers and could be armed with M240D or M2 Browning machine guns. A report in September 2019 by the State Department Inspector General found that a seat on a CH-46 for a seven-minute flight cost US$1,500. Seven of the CH-46s were rendered unusable and abandoned at Kabul Airport following the 2021 evacuation from Afghanistan.

Canada

The Royal Canadian Air Force procured six CH-113 Labrador helicopters for the SAR role and the Canadian Army acquired 12 of the similar CH-113A Voyageur for the medium-lift transport role. The RCAF Labradors were delivered first with the first one entering service on 11 October 1963. When the larger CH-147 Chinook was procured by the Canadian Forces in the mid-1970s, the Voyageur fleet was converted to Labrador specifications to undertake SAR missions. The refurbished Voyageurs were re-designated as CH-113A Labradors, thus a total of 15 Labradors were ultimately in service.

The Labrador was fitted with a watertight hull for marine landings, a 5,000 kilogram cargo hook and an external rescue hoist mounted over the right front door. It featured a 1,110 kilometer flying range, emergency medical equipment and an 18-person passenger capacity. In multiple instances throughout the 1970s and 1980s, this increased range provided the capability of the CH-113 to provide assistance to U.S. Coast Guard (USCG) missions or perform long range medevacs over distances the USCG helicopters at the time simply could not reach.

In 1981, a mid-life upgrade of the fleet was carried out by Boeing Canada in Arnprior, Ontario. Known as the SAR-CUP (Search and Rescue Capability Upgrade Program), the refit scheme included new instrumentation, a nose-mounted weather radar, a tail-mounted auxiliary power unit, a new high-speed rescue hoist mounted over the side door and front-mounted searchlights. A total of six CH-113s and five CH-113As were upgraded with the last delivered in 1984. Nonetheless, as a search and rescue helicopter it endured heavy use and hostile weather conditions; which had begun to take their toll on the Labrador fleet by the 1990s, resulting in increasing maintenance costs and the need for prompt replacement.

In 1992, it was announced that the Labradors were to be replaced by 15 new helicopters, a variant of the AgustaWestland EH101, designated CH-149 Chimo. The order was subsequently cancelled by the Jean Chrétien Liberal government in 1993, resulting in cancellation penalties, as well as extending the service life of the Labrador fleet. However, in 1998, a CH-113 from CFB Greenwood crashed on Quebec's Gaspé Peninsula while returning from a SAR mission, resulting in the deaths of all crewmembers on board. The crash placed pressure upon the government to procure a replacement, thus an order was placed with the manufacturers of the EH101 for 15 aircraft to perform the search-and-rescue mission, designated CH-149 Cormorant. CH-149 deliveries began in 2003, allowing the last CH-113 to be retired in 2004. In October 2005 Columbia Helicopters of Aurora, Oregon purchased eight of the retired CH-113 Labradors to add to their fleet of 15 Vertol 107-II helicopters.

Sweden 
In 1963, Sweden procured ten UH-46Bs from the US as a transport and anti-submarine helicopter for the Swedish Armed Forces, designated Hkp 4A. In 1973, a further eight Kawasaki-built KV-107s, which were accordingly designated Hkp 4B, were acquired to replace the older Piasecki H-21. During the Cold War, the fleet's primary missions were anti-submarine warfare and troop transportation. They were also frequently employed in the search and rescue role, most famously during the rescue operation of the MS Estonia after it sank in the Baltic Sea on 28 September 1994. In the 1980s, the Hkp 4A was phased out, having been replaced by the Eurocopter AS332 Super Puma; the later Kawasaki-built Sea Knights continued in operational service until 2011, they were replaced by the UH-60 Black Hawk and NH90.

Civilian and others

The civilian version, designated as the BV 107-II Vertol, was developed prior to the military CH-46. It was operated commercially by New York Airways, Pan American World Airways and later on by Columbia Helicopters. Among the diversity of tasks was commuter service in the mid-1960s from the roof of the Pan Am skyscraper in Manhattan to JFK Airport in Queens, pulling a hover barge, and constructing transmission towers for overhead power lines.

In December 2006, Columbia Helicopters purchased the type certificate of the Model 107 from Boeing, with the aim of eventually producing new-build aircraft themselves.

Variants

American versions
Model 107 Company model number for basic prototype, one built.
Model 107-II Commercial airline helicopter. All subsequent commercial aircraft were produced as BV 107-II-2, two built as Boeing Vertol prototypes, five sold to New York Airways, ten supplied to Kawasaki as sub-assemblies or as parts. The second prototype was later rebuilt into a Sea Knight replacement for a lost unit in the Swedish navy she was named Y64 in Swedish service.
Model 107M Company model number for military transport of BV-107/II-2 for the U.S. Marine Corps.
YHC-1A Vertol Model 107 for test and evaluation by the United States Army. Adopted by the U.S. Marine Corps as the HRB-1. Later redesignated YCH-46C, three built.
HRB-1 Original designation before being renamed as CH-46A before delivery under the 1962 United States Tri-Service aircraft designation system.

CH-46A Medium-lift assault and cargo transport and SAR helicopter for the USMC, fitted with two 1,250 shp (935 kW) General Electric T58-GE-8 turboshaft engines. Previously designated HRB-1. 160 built for USMC, one static airframe.
UH-46A Medium-lift utility transport helicopter for the United States Navy. Similar to the CH-46A. 14 built.
HH-46A Approximately 50 CH-46As were converted into SAR helicopters for the United States Navy base rescue role.
RH-46A Planned conversion of CH-46As into minesweeping helicopters for the US Navy, none converted. Nine SH-3As were converted to the RH-3A configuration instead.
UH-46B Development of the CH-46A to specification HX/H2 for the United States Air Force; 12 ordered in 1962, cancelled and Sikorsky S-61R / CH-3C ordered instead.
YCH-46C YHC-1A redesignated in 1962. United States Army retained two, NASA used one for vertical autonomous landing trials (VALT).

CH-46D Medium-lift assault and cargo transport helicopter for the USMC, fitted with two 1,400 shp (1,044 kW) General Electric T58-GE-10 turboshaft engines. 266 built.
HH-46D Surviving HH-46A were upgraded and a small number of UH-46Ds were converted into SAR helicopters. SAR upgrades included the addition of an external rescue hoist near the front crew door and an 18-inch X 18-inch Doppler RADAR system located behind the nose landing gear, which provided for automatic, day/night, over-water hovering capability for at sea rescue. Additionally a "Loud Hailer" was installed opposite the crew entrance door for communicating with downed aviators on the ground or in the water.

UH-46D Medium-lift utility transport helicopter for the US Navy combat supply role. Similar to the CH-46D. Ten built and one conversion from CH-46D.
CH-46E Approximately 275 -A, -D, and -F airframes were updated to CH-46E standards with improved avionics, hydraulics, drive train and upgraded T58-GE-16 and T58-GE-16/A engines.

HH-46E Three CH-46Es were converted into SAR helicopters for Marine Transport Squadron One (VMR-1) at MCAS Cherry Point.
CH-46F Improved version of CH-46D, electrical distribution, com/nav update BUNO 154845-157726. Last production model in the United States. 174 built, later reverted to CH-46E.
VH-46F Unofficial designation of standard CH-46F used by HMX-1 as VIP support transport helicopter.

CH-46X Replacement helicopter based on the Boeing Model 360, this Advance Technology Demonstrator from the 1980s never entered production. The aircraft relied heavily on composites for its construction and had a beefier drive train to handle the twin Avco-Lycoming AL5512 engines (4,200 shp).
XH-49 Original designation of UH-46B.

Canadian versions
CH-113 Labrador Search and rescue version of the Model 107-II-9 for the Royal Canadian Air Force
CH-113A Voyageur Assault and utility transport version of the Model 107-II-28 for the Canadian Army. Later converted to CH-113A Labrador when the Canadian Forces acquired the CH-47 Chinook

Japanese versions

KV-107II-1 (CT58-110-1)
Utility transport version, one built from Boeing-supplied kits.
KV-107II-2 (CT58-110-1)
Commercial airline version, nine built from Boeing-supplied kits.
KV-107IIA-2 (CT58-140-1)
Improved version of the KV-107/II-2, three built.
KV-107II-3 (CT58-110-1)
Minesweeping version for the Japan Maritime Self-Defense Force (JMSDF), two built.
KV-107IIA-3 (CT58-IHI-10-M1)
Uprated version of the KV-107/II-3, seven built.
KV-107II-4 (CT58-IHI-110-1)
Assault and utility transport version for the Japan Ground Self-Defense Force (JGSDF), 41 built.
KV-107II-4A (CT58-IHI-110-1)
VIP version of the KV-107/II-4, one built.
KV-107IIA-4 (CT58-IHI-140-1)
Uprated version of the KV-107/II-4, 18 built.
KV-107II-5 (CT58-IHI-110-1)
Long-range SAR version for the Japan Air Self-Defense Force (JASDF), 17 built.
KV-107IIA-5 (CT58-IHI-104-1)
Uprated version of the KV-107II-5, 35 built.
KV-107II-7 (CT58-110-1)
VIP transport version, one built.
KV-107II-16
HKP 4C for Swedish Navy. Powered by Rolls-Royce Gnome H.1200 turboshaft engines, eight built.
KV-107IIA-17 (CT58-140-1)
Long-range transport version for the Tokyo Metropolitan Police Department, one built.
KV-107IIA-SM-1 (CT58-IHI-140-1M1)
Firefighting helicopter for Saudi Arabia, seven built.
KV-107IIA-SM-2 (CT58-IHI-140-1M1)
Aeromedical and rescue helicopter for Saudi Arabia, four built.
KV-107IIA-SM-3 (CT58-IHI-140-1M1)
VIP transport helicopter for Saudi Arabia, two built.
KV-107IIA-SM-4 (CT58-IHI-140-1M1)
Air ambulance helicopter for Saudi Arabia, three built.

Swedish versions

HKP 4A Boeing Vertol 107-II-14, used originally by Air Force for search and rescue, ten built
HKP 4B Boeing Vertol 107-II-15, mine-layer/antisubmarine warfare/search and rescue helicopter for Navy, three built and one conversion from Boeing-Vertol civil prototype
HKP 4C Kawasaki KV-107-II-16, advanced mine-layer/ASW/SAR helicopter for Navy, eight built
HKP 4D Rebuilt HKP 4A for Navy as SAR/ASW helicopter, four conversions

Operators

Military and government

 United States Department of State
 State Department Air Wing

Civil

 Helifor Canada

 Columbia Helicopters
 Sky Aviation Corp

Former operators

 Canadian Army - Voyageur variant (later as CH-113A)
 Royal Canadian Air Force - both CH-113 and CH-113A
 103 Search and Rescue Squadron
 413 Transport and Rescue Squadron
 102 Composite Unit / 424 Transport and Rescue Squadron
 442 Transport and Rescue Squadron
 450 Transport Helicopter Squadron

 Japan Air Self-Defense Force
 Japan Ground Self-Defense Force
 Japan Maritime Self-Defense Force
 Tokyo Metropolitan Police Department

 Ministry of Interior

 Swedish Air Force
 Swedish Navy

 Royal Thai Army

 New York Airways
 Pan American Airways
 United States Marine Corps
 HMX-1
 HMM-262
 HMM-265
 HMM-268
 HMM-364
 HMM-764
 HMM-774
 HMMT-164
 VMR-1
 United States Navy

Notable accidents and incidents

On 14 October 1963 New York Airways Flight 600, a Boeing Vertol 107, registration N6673D, crashed shortly after takeoff from Idlewild Airport (now JFK) en route to Newark via Wall Street. All three passengers and all three crew members died. The accident was caused by mechanical failure due to contaminated lubricants.
 On 15 July 1966 in the Vietnam War during Operation Hastings, two CH-46As of HMM-164 collided at Landing Zone Crow while another, crashed into a tree avoiding the first two, resulting in 2 Marines killed. Another CH-46 of HMM-265 was shot down at the LZ later that day resulting in a further 13 Marine deaths.
 On 4 June 1968, CH-46D BuNo 152533 of HMM-165 was hit by anti-aircraft fire at Landing Zone Loon and crashed killing 13 Marines.
 On 14 March 1969, CH-46D BuNo 154841 of HMM-161 was hit by a B-40 rocket as it conducted a resupply and medevac mission at Landing Zone Sierra, killing 12 Marines and 1 Navy corpsman.
 On 10 May 1996, a CH-46E collided in mid-air with an Bell AH-1W attack helicopter, killing fourteen (twelve Marines, one Navy sailor, and one Army soldier) aboard the two helicopters. The pilots of the CH-46E were injured. Both helicopters, of HMM-266, were operating from USS Saipan and were participating in Operation Purple Star, a joint exercise involving troops from the U.S. and the UK at Camp Lejeune, North Carolina.
 On 2 October 1998, a CH-113 Labrador crashed near Marsoui, Quebec, after an inflight fire. All six crewmembers were killed.
 On 9 December 1999, a CH-46D Sea Knight BuNo 154790 of HMM-166 crashed during a boarding exercise off the coast of San Diego, California, killing seven U.S. Marines. The pilot landed the CH-46 short on the deck of the USNS Pecos, causing the left rear tire and strut to become entangled in the safety netting at the back of the ship, which caused it to plunge into the ocean.

Aircraft on display

Canada
 Canada Aviation and Space Museum – Labrador 11301
 Comox Air Force Museum – Labrador 11310
 National Air Force Museum of Canada – Labrador 11315
 Greenwood Military Aviation Museum – Labrador 11308

Japan
 Japan Air Self Defense Force Hamamatsu Air Base Publication Center, Hamamatsu, Shizuoka, Japan
 Kakamigahara Aerospace Science Museum, Kakamigahara, Gifu, Japan
 Kawasaki Vertol 107-II – Kawasaki Good Times World, within Kobe Maritime Museum, Kobe, Hyōgo, Japan.

Sweden
 Aeroseum, Gothenburg, Sweden – Boeing Vertol/Kawasaki KV-107-II (CH-46), Hkp 4C, c/n 4093, Fv 04072 "72"
 Swedish Air Force Museum, Linköping Sweden. Prototype BV-107-II N6679D. Bought used from Boeing in 1970.

United States
 150954 – USS Midway Museum in San Diego, California displays HH-46A (c/n 2040) as U.S. Navy SA-46 of HC-3 on one side and VR-46 of HC-11 on the other.
 151952 – National Museum of Naval Aviation in Pensacola, FL displays HH-46D (c/n 2102) as U.S Navy HW-00 of HC-6.
 153389 – Carolinas Aviation Museum, Charlotte, North Carolina, has Raymond Clausen's Medal of Honor mission CH-46E (c/n 2287) as HMM-263 EG-16. The rear fuselage of BuNo 153335 was used in restoration.
 153986 – National Museum of the Marine Corps Quantico, Virginia has a walk-through exhibit containing the rear half of a CH-46D displayed as the former BuNo 153986 (c/n 2337) YK-13 from HMM-364 with their logo, The Purple Fox. The front half of the aircraft was used as a training aid display for HMX-1.
 153402 – New River Aviation Memorial at the front gate of Marine Corps Air Station New River, (part of Camp Lejeune) in Jacksonville, North Carolina – CH-46E (c/n 2300) as YS-02 of HMM-162 on one side and HMM-261 on the other.
 153369 – National Air and Space Museum at the Steven F. Udvar-Hazy Center in Chantilly, Virginia has CH-46D (c/n 2265) displayed as MQ-400 of HMM-774. This aircraft is on loan from National Museum of the Marine Corps, Quantico, Virginia. The aircraft was last flown on 1 August 2015 at the Marine Corps' formal sunset ceremony for the type which was the last public showing of an airworthy Marine Corps CH-46.
 154009 – Patriots Point Naval and Maritime Museum in Mount Pleasant, South Carolina, has CH-46E (c/n 2360) of HMM-164.
 154803 – Flying Leatherneck Aviation Museum, San Diego, California, USA has CH-46E (c/n 2410) as YS-09 Lady Ace 09 of HMM-165. The CH-46 took part in Operation Frequent Wind and was used to evacuate Ambassador Graham Martin, the last United States Ambassador to South Vietnam from the United States Embassy, Saigon on 30 April 1975.
 156427 – Veterans Museum Dyersburg Army Air Base in Halls, Tennessee has YP-05, a CH-46E wearing the Evileyes of HMM-163. 
 156469 – Pima Air and Space Museum in Tucson, Arizona. Started life as a CH-46F, and was converted to the CH-46E standard sometime between 1975 and 1979. It is displayed as YP-12 of HMM-163 "Evileyes" Scheme; accurate to this airframe. (On loan from the National Museum of the Marine Corps.) 
 157688 – Classic Rotors Rotorcraft Museum in Ramona, CA. displays HH-46E '02' from VMR-1 Cherry Point MCAS N.C.

Specifications (CH-46E)

See also

References
Citations

Bibliography

 Andrade, John U.S.Military Aircraft Designations and Serials since 1909. Midland Counties Publications, 1979. .
 Andrade, John. Militair 1982. London: Aviation Press Limited, 1982. .
 Dunstan, Simon. Vietnam Choppers: Helicopters in Battle 1950–1975, Osprey Publishing, 2003. .
 Murray, Williamson and Robert H. Scales. The Iraq War. Harvard University Press, 2005. .
 Rottman, Gordon and Adam Hook. Vietnam Airmobile Warfare Tactics. Osprey Publishing, 2007. .

External links

 CH-46D/E Sea Knight and CH-46 history pages on U.S. Navy site; CH-46 page on USMC site
 CH-46 product page and CH-46 history page on Boeing.com
 Columbia Helicopters — Largest Civilian Operator of BV/KV Model 107
 Detail List of CH-113 Labradors & Voyageurs
 Kawasaki Helicopter Services (S.A.) Ltd.

Boeing CH-46 Sea Knight
Tandem rotor helicopters
1950s United States military transport aircraft
Boeing aircraft
Kawasaki Aerospace Company
1960s United States helicopters
Twin-turbine helicopters
Aircraft first flown in 1958